Petroselki is a rural locality in Verkhnelyubazhsky Selsoviet Rural Settlement, Fatezhsky District, Kursk Oblast, Russia. The population as of 2010 is 26.

Geography 
The village is located in the Svapa River basin (a right tributary of the Seym River), 113 km from the Russia–Ukraine border, 62 km north-west of Kursk, 19.5 km north-east of the district center – the town Fatezh, 7.5 km from the selsoviet center – Verkhny Lyubazh.

Climate
Petroselki has a warm-summer humid continental climate (Dfb in the Köppen climate classification).

Transport 
Petroselki is located 5 km from the federal route  Crimea Highway (a part of the European route ), 4.5 km from the road of regional importance  (Verkhny Lyubazh – Ponyri), on the road of intermunicipal significance  (M2 "Crimea Highway" – Petroselki), 26 km from the nearest railway halt 487 km (railway line Oryol – Kursk).

The rural locality is situated 64 km from Kursk Vostochny Airport, 186 km from Belgorod International Airport and 234 km from Voronezh Peter the Great Airport.

References

Notes

Sources

Rural localities in Fatezhsky District